Kållered SK is a Swedish football club located in Kållered in Mölndal Municipality, Västra Götaland County.

Background
Kållered SK is a sports club from Kållered and was formed on 9 December 1938.  The club is also known as Kållereds SK and specialises in bandy, football and ice hockey. In the beginning the club only played bandy and was therefore named Kålleryds Bandyklubb. However other sports were quickly taken up, including athletics and orienteering, and on 3 March 1939 the club changed its name to Kållereds Sportklubb. KSK is a now a rather large club playing in many different age groups and classes.

Since their foundation Kållered SK has participated mainly in the middle and lower divisions of the Swedish football league system.  In the 2010 season the club played in Division 3 Mellersta Götaland, which is the fifth tier of Swedish football, and has won promotion to Division 2 via the play-offs drawing 2–2 on aggregate with IFK Hässleholm but winning on away goals.  This is the first time that KSK has reached Division 2. They play their home matches at the Kållereds IP in Kållered.

Kållered SK are affiliated to the Göteborgs Fotbollförbund.

Season to season

Attendances

In recent seasons Kållered SK have had the following average attendances:

Footnotes

External links
 Kållered SK – Official website

Football clubs in Gothenburg
Bandy clubs in Sweden
Association football clubs established in 1938
Bandy clubs established in 1938
1938 establishments in Sweden
Football clubs in Västra Götaland County